Eudonia albertalis is a moth in the family Crambidae. It was described by Harrison Gray Dyar Jr. in 1929. It is found in North America, where it has been recorded from Alberta to British Columbia, Washington, Idaho and Wyoming.

The wingspan is about 18 mm.

References

Moths described in 1929
Eudonia